Archie Horror is an imprint of Archie Comics Publications, Inc. focusing on the company's horror-related titles. Prior to the creation of the imprint the titles were published under the normal Archie Comics banner.

The titles in the imprint are rated "TEEN+" due to their content and subject matter which include realistic violence, gore, blood, disturbing scenes, and some moderate language. All titles under this imprint are set in alternative realities from the core Archie Comics series, and each title is independent from the others.

Publication history

Beginnings
In 2013, Archie Comics announced Afterlife with Archie to be written by Roberto Aguirre-Sacasa and illustrated by Francesco Francavilla. It is the first horror title as well as the first series to be rated "TEEN+" under Archie Comics. The series was partially inspired by the zombie-themed variant cover Francavilla did for Life with Archie: The Married Life. The series launched in October 2013 to critical and commercial success. The first eight issues sold out while some reviewers called it one of the best horror comics to come out in a long time. It won three awards at the 2013 Ghastly Awards for Best New Series, Best Ongoing Title, and Best Colorist for Francesco Francavilla.

In 2014, Archie Comics released Afterlife with Archie #6, which details the whereabouts of Sabrina Spellman who had not been seen since the first issue. The issue was positively received, leading Archie Comics to announce a solo series starring Sabrina in June 2014. The first issue of Chilling Adventures of Sabrina, an occult horror story detailing Sabrina's teenage witch origins in the 1960s, was released in October 2014. As with Afterlife with Archie, the series received critical and commercial success with the first two issues selling out.

Creation of imprint
In March 2015, Archie Comics announced the Archie Horror imprint due to the successes of Afterlife with Archie and Chilling Adventures of Sabrina. Roberto Aguirre-Sacasa, who is also Archie Comics' Chief Creative Officer, said that "in-house we started referring to these books as the Archie Horror books" so "when it started to look like Afterlife #8 and Sabrina #2 were going to be released around the same time, why don’t we formalize something that is already happening, which is the imprint.”

Chilling Adventures of Sabrina #2 was the first to be released under the imprint in April 2015, followed by Afterlife with Archie #8 in May 2015.

Further titles
A one-shot titled Jughead: The Hunger was released in March 2017 as part of Archie Comics' "pilot season" for the New Riverdale lineup. The story focuses on Jughead Jones and his family's lycanthropic heritage to explain Jughead's excessive hunger. It was written by Frank Tieri with artwork provided by Michael Walsh. The book was picked up as an ongoing series that July and debuted its first official issue in October with Pat & Tim Kennedy taking over as artists.

In March 2015, along with the announcement of the imprint, Archie Comics revealed that a new title was in the works featuring a "major female Archie character from the past" for the imprint. Written by Megan Smallwood, with art by co-writer Greg Smallwood, Vampironica was officially announced in December 2017 and debuted in March 2018.

Two 5-issue limited series were announced in October 2018. From writer Cullen Bunn and artist Laura Braga, Blossoms 666 features twins Cheryl and Jason Blossom competing for the title of Antichrist. The series released its first issue in January 2019. The second series, a crossover titled Jughead: The Hunger vs. Vampironica features the protagonists of the two respective titles facing off against one another. The series comes from Tieri and the Kennedys and was released in April 2019. Jack Morelli serves as letterer for all six titles.

Titles

Ongoing series
 Afterlife with Archie (October 2013–present)
 Chilling Adventures of Sabrina (October 2014–present)
 Jughead: The Hunger (October 2017–present)
 Vampironica (March 2018–present)
 Vampironica New Blood (December 2019- April 2020)

Limited series
 Blossoms 666 (January 2019–July 2019)
 Jughead: The Hunger vs. Vampironica (April 2019- October 2019)

One-Shots
 Chilling Adventures of Sabrina Presents: Madam Satan (October 2020)
 Chilling Adventures Presents: Jinx's Grim Fairy Tales (August 2022)
 Chilling Adventures Presents... Weirder Mysteries (September 2022)
 Chilling Adventures of Salem (October 2022)
 Fear the Funhouse (October 2022)
 Happy Horror Days (December 2022)
 The Return of Chilling Adventures in Sorcery (December 2022)
 Chilling Adventures Presents... Betty: The Final Girl (February 2023)
 Chilling Adventures Presents... Pop's Chock'lit Shoppe of Horrors (March 2023)

Creative teams
The following is a list of main and frequent contributors to publications of the Archie Horror imprint, ordered alphabetically by surname.

Other media

In September 2017, it was reported that a live-action Chilling Adventures of Sabrina television series was being developed for The CW by Warner Bros. Television and Berlanti Productions as a companion series to Riverdale, with a planned  2018–2019 release. Lee Toland Krieger directed the pilot, which was written by Roberto Aguirre-Sacasa. Both are executive producers along with Greg Berlanti, Sarah Schechter, and Jon Goldwater. In December 2017, the project moved to Netflix with a two-season order, 10 episodes each. In January 2018, it was announced that Kiernan Shipka has signed on to play the lead role of Sabrina Spellman. The first season of Chilling Adventures of Sabrina'' was released worldwide on Netflix on October 26, 2018.

Collected Editions

Afterlife with Archie

Chilling Adventures of Sabrina

Jughead: The Hunger

Vampironica

Blossoms 666

Jughead: The Hunger vs. Vampironica

See also
Archie's Weird Mysteries
List of Archie Comics imprint publications

References

Archie Comics imprints
Comic book publishing companies of the United States
Horror comics